Anthony Garet Phillips (born 11 April 1990) is a former South African baseball infielder. He has been a member of the Seattle Mariners, Philadelphia Phillies, Los Angeles Angels of Anaheim and Colorado Rockies organizations. He bats and throws right-handed. He has been compared to a "young Chuck Knoblauch" by the Seattle Post-Intelligencer. José Moreno, Phillips' former manager, compared his style of play to that of David Eckstein. While not officially retired, Phillips is now a minor league coach.

Professional career

Seattle Mariners
Born in Bellville, Western Cape, South Africa, Phillips was scouted by Pat Kelly and Phillip Biersteker to sign with the Seattle Mariners at age 16 after his participation in the 2006 World Baseball Junior Championship. He began his professional career with the rookie-level Arizona League Mariners. Phillips batted .279 with 24 runs, 34 hits, 1 double, 9 RBIs and 5 stolen bases in 45 games. In the next season, he played with three levels of the Mariners' organization including the rookie-level Pulaski Mariners, the Class-A Short Season Everett AquaSox and the Class-A Advanced High Desert Mavericks. With Pulaski, he batted .196 with 7 runs, 11 hits, 1 double, 4 RBIs and 4 stolen bases in 14 games. He played 51 games with the AquaSox and batted .187 with 23 runs, 28 hits, 5 doubles, 1 triple, 2 home runs, 17 RBIs and 5 stolen bases. Finally, with the Mavericks, Phillips batted .111 with 1 hit and 1 RBI in 3 games. He hit his first career home run on 10 July against the Tri-City Dust Devils. He spent the 2009 season with the Class-A Short Season Everett AquaSox and batted .247 with 29 runs, 59 hits, 8 doubles, 3 triples, 7 home runs, 28 RBIs and 3 stolen bases in 68 games. He was first on the AquaSox in caught stealing (8) and second in at-bats (239), home runs and strikeouts (65). He began the 2010 season with the Triple-A Tacoma Rainiers but, after just one game, he was assigned to extended spring training.

Philadelphia Phillies
Phillips signed a minor league deal with the Philadelphia Phillies in December 2013. Over the course of the 2014 season, he played with three different teams in the Phillies' minor league system.

St. Paul Saints
For the 2015 season, Phillips played for the St. Paul Saints in the independent American Association.

Los Angeles Angels of Anaheim
Phillips returned to Minor League Baseball in 2016, playing for the Arkansas Travelers, the AA affiliate of the Angels. He elected free agency on 7 November 2016.

Colorado Rockies
On 10 January 2017, Phillips signed a minor league deal with the Colorado Rockies. He was released on 15 June 2018.

Return to St. Paul
On 21 June 2018, Phillips signed with the St. Paul Saints. He was released on 6 August 2018.

Kansas City T-Bones
On 17 August 2018, Phillips signed with the Kansas City T-Bones of the American Association. He was released on 14 November 2018.

Coaching career
In December 2018, Phillips became the bench coach for the Beloit Snappers, a minor league affiliate of the Oakland Athletics.

International career
He was selected to play in the 2009 World Baseball Classic for South Africa. He played two games and batted .222 with 1 run, 2 hits and 1 RBI.

He competed at the Africa/Europe 2020 Olympic Qualification tournament in Italy in September 2019.

Personal life
His father, Alan Phillips, played in the 2000 Summer Olympics at age 44, making him the oldest man ever on an Olympic baseball roster. His brother, Jonathan Phillips (born 16 April 1986), played in the Milwaukee Brewers organization in 2003. Growing up, Phillips was a fan of Ken Griffey Jr. and played rugby and badminton. He is not related to Tony Phillips.

References

External links

1990 births
Living people
Albuquerque Isotopes players
Arizona League Mariners players
Arkansas Travelers players
Baseball second basemen
Baseball shortstops
Baseball third basemen
Clinton LumberKings players
Clearwater Threshers players
Everett AquaSox players
Hartford Yard Goats players
High Desert Mavericks players
Jackson Generals (Southern League) players
Kansas City T-Bones players
Lakewood BlueClaws players
People from Bellville, South Africa
Pulaski Mariners players
Reading Fightin Phils players
South African expatriate baseball players in the United States
St. Paul Saints players
Tacoma Rainiers players
White South African people
2009 World Baseball Classic players
Sportspeople from the Western Cape